Hamaneh (also Romanized as Hāmāneh; also known as Hamane Robatat, Homān, and Human) is a village in Rabatat Rural District, Kharanaq District, Ardakan County, Yazd Province, Iran. At the 2006 census, its population was 187, in 69 families.

References 

Populated places in Ardakan County